Quintuplets is an American sitcom that aired 22 episodes on Fox from June 16, 2004 to January 12, 2005. The program starred Andy Richter and Rebecca Creskoff and shared some of their experiences parenting teenage quintuplets.

Synopsis
The series is set in Nutley, New Jersey, and looks like a typical family sitcom.  Much of the storyline focuses on the difficulty of supporting a large family of teens, both financially and emotionally, as they grapple with the reality that they're no longer as cute as when they were babies.

The house is a typical three-bedroom family home.  The three male siblings share a room with bunk beds, the two females share another room.  The kitchen contains a double-wide beer cooler as a refrigerator, and the basement contains a walk-in freezer, both to store the large amounts of food such a large family requires.  The situation may be seen to parallel and parody the old sitcom The Brady Bunch, by highlighting the impracticality of the large family.

The theme song, "Suck or Shine," was performed by Chris and Tad.

Cast and characters
 Bob Chase (Andy Richter) – The father sells office cubicles and barely makes enough money to support his large family. Most of his time is spent trying to save money, and he only occasionally provides parenting for his five teens, but he'd prefer to get away whenever he has the chance. He also opines that he thinks half his children are freaks, blaming this and the fact that there were so many at once, on the fact that they were artificially inseminated. 
 Carol Chase (Rebecca Creskoff) – The mother maintains the large family and house in "typical sitcom homemaker" mode. In one episode she attempts to go back to work, but nobody wants her because she's been raising kids for 15 years. She goes back to being a homemaker and remains one for the rest of the show. She enforces the house rules.
 Parker Chase (Jake McDorman) – The popular boy. Tallest of the children, good-looking, successful in academics and sports. He teases his brothers mercilessly, especially Pearce, but is also quick to defend them. The male quints share a deep bond, probably from sharing the womb. At one point the youngest and shortest, Patton, says that Parker took all the good genes and left him with the short ones and Pearce with the weird ones.
 Pearce Chase (Johnny K. Lewis) – The curly-haired weirdest quint. He boldly shares with anyone his strange perspective on just about any subject, and is so odd that he no longer responds to rejection.  
 Penny Chase (April Matson) – The intellectual, who is vigorously nonconformist. Her taste in clothing and hairstyle frequently gets her mistaken for the typical goth. She enjoys reading and sometimes feels inadequate to Paige.
 Paige Chase (Sarah Wright) – The beautiful girl. She spends most of her time thinking of and attending to her appearance. She's not the brightest of the family, but she's bubbly and kind. 
 Patton Chase (Ryan Pinkston) – The youngest of the children, and the shortest at 4'10". This is a source of amusement to the family and shame to the father, and the mother is often overly-nurturing. He takes growth hormones. He is girl-crazy and his typical line to girls (and, in one episode, a guy when he was pretending to be gay to avoid being pulverized) is, "Yes I am, you likey?." It usually works, but his sisters often find it disgusting.

Episodes

See also
 Arrested Development – in which Richter himself played a set of identical quintuplets.

References

External links
 

2000s American teen sitcoms
2004 American television series debuts
2005 American television series endings
English-language television shows
Fox Broadcasting Company original programming
Television series about families
Television series about teenagers
Television series by 20th Century Fox Television
Television shows set in New Jersey
Television series by Imagine Entertainment